Joris Chotard (born 24 September 2001) is a French professional footballer who plays as midfielder for  club Montpellier.

Club career 
Born in Orange, Vaucluse, Chotard is a product of Montpellier's youth academy. He scored his first professional goal in a 2–1 Ligue 1 defeat to Clermont on 8 May 2022, a volley described as "extraordinary". On 29 June 2022, Chotard extended his contract with Montpellier.

References

External links

Living people
2001 births
People from Orange, Vaucluse
Sportspeople from Vaucluse
French footballers
Footballers from Provence-Alpes-Côte d'Azur
Association football midfielders
France youth international footballers
Ligue 1 players
Championnat National 2 players
Championnat National 3 players
US Pontet Grand Avignon 84 players
Montpellier HSC players